The 2022 Portland 112 was an ARCA Menards Series West race that was held on June 4, 2022, at the Portland International Raceway in Portland, Oregon. It was contested over 57 laps on the  road course. It was the fourth race of the 2022 ARCA Menards Series West season. Sunrise Ford Racing driver Jake Drew collected his first career West Series victory.

Background

Entry list 

 (R) denotes rookie driver.
 (i) denotes driver who is ineligible for series driver points.

Practice/Qualifying

Starting Lineups

Race

Race results

References 

2022 in sports in Oregon
Portland 112
2022 ARCA Menards Series West